William Greaves is a filmmaker.

William Greaves may also refer to:

William Greaves (mayor), Lord Mayor of Nottingham 1663-1664
William Greaves, creator of Greaves' Rules
William Greaves (MP) (died by 1621), Sheriff of Nottingham 1582 and MP for Nottingham (UK Parliament constituency) 1601
William Greaves (cricketer) (1830-1869), Australian cricketer
William Michael Herbert Greaves, Scottish astronomer

See also
William Graves (disambiguation)
William Grieve (disambiguation)